Michaela Bayerlová (born 14 December 1998) is a Czech tennis player.

Bayerlová has a career-high singles ranking by the WTA of  325 and a best doubles ranking of 205, both achieved January 2023.

She won her first bigger ITF title at the 2022 Tevlin Women's Challenger in Toronto, in the doubles draw, partnering Jang Su-jeong.

Bayerlová played college tennis at the Washington State University.

ITF finals

Singles: 10 (5 titles, 5 runner-ups)

Doubles: 10 (6 titles, 4 runner-ups)

Junior finals

ITF Finals

Singles: 4 runner-ups

Doubles: 7 (6 titles, 1 runner-up)

References

External links
 
 

1998 births
Living people
Czech female tennis players
Washington State Cougars women's tennis players
21st-century Czech women